Mendham is a village in the Canadian province of Saskatchewan within the Rural Municipality of Happyland No. 231 and Census Division No. 8.

History 
Mendham incorporated as a village on April 1, 1930.

Demographics 

Notable people
 Ernie Moser - Former professional ice hockey player

See also
 List of communities in Saskatchewan
 Villages of Saskatchewan

Footnotes

Villages in Saskatchewan
Happyland No. 231, Saskatchewan
Division No. 8, Saskatchewan